The Newton Gang (ca. 1919 through 1924) was an outlaw gang of the early 20th century, and the most successful train robbers and bank robbers in history. From 1919 through 1924 the gang robbed dozens of banks, claiming a total of eighty-seven banks (unconfirmed)  and six trains (confirmed).  According to Willis Newton, the brothers "took in more money than the Dalton Gang, Butch Cassidy's Wild Bunch and the James-Younger Gang combined." 
According to their own claims, they never killed anyone. It is true that they were never charged with any death or injuries associated with their robberies, although one daylight robbery in Toronto, Ontario, Canada proved nearly fatal for one bank messenger. 

For the 1924 train robbery near Rondout, Illinois (the world's largest at the time) the brothers gained a second round of fame in their retirement, long after they had given up their criminal careers. In 1975, they participated in a documentary film, and then a more in-depth oral history project, that was eventually published in book form, possibly producing one of the clearest records of the career of criminal gang of the period, as told by multiple participants.  This second round of fame led to a feature film being produced by a major Hollywood studio, after the death of the last surviving brother.

Formation and outlaw career
The Newton brothers came of age in Uvalde County, Texas. The four sons of a large cotton farming family were sharecroppers on the newly settled great plains.  Raised on outlaw stories by their mother, leader and mastermind Willis Newton entered the workforce at an early age. He followed the contemporary exploits of outlaw Harry Tracy in the purple press of the time, as a newsboy. He says he cried when he heard the news of Tracy's suicide in Oct 1902. Willis quit school after a single year of attending classes, too proud to continue when his pants had to be patched in the seat.

It's unclear when the brothers first ran afoul of the law but sharecropping didn't seem to suit their fierce pride. Willis Newton claims that at age twenty he was convicted for a crime he didn't commit - his brother Wylie "Dock" Newton (b. 1891) (Prison #639) stole loose cotton from the loading dock of one processing gin and tried to sell it at another. Unable to find Dock, local authorities arrested J. Willis Newton (born January 19, 1889) and charged him instead. A local jury reportedly convicted Willis on slim evidence and he was sentenced to a year in the brutal Texas State Prison system, where he was forced to pick more cotton. His attitude hardened quickly in the face of the inhuman conditions and his perception of the injustice of it all. Dock soon joined him, entering the prison system soon after, possibly for robbing a Post Office of stamps. (The record indicates simply it was for a theft of less than fifty dollars.) From 1909 until 1918-1920 the two brothers were in and out of the Texas penal system due to their many escape attempts, which led to further sentences and a deeper hardening of attitudes. Eventually released, Willis began a career of petty theft, usually involving the night time theft of clothing from general stores. Brothers Jess (older) and Joe (much younger) stayed out of the penal system until later, working regularly as bronc busters and ranch hands.

In 1914 Willis Newton began a more serious criminal career. He and an accomplice robbed a Southern Pacific Railroad passenger train in Cline, Texas, eighteen miles west of Uvalde in southwestern Uvalde County, taking $4,700  at gunpoint from passengers. Then in 1916 Willis robbed a bank in Boswell, Oklahoma in the company of a gang he joined in Durant, Oklahoma, taking just over $10,000 and escaping on horseback. In 1917, he went back to prison {Prison #83732} for burglary but eventually forged letters to secure a pardon. Upon release Willis served an apprenticeship of sorts with a crew of bank burglars with a rotating lineup due to accidental death and reckless behavior. Pride and intelligence led Willis to decide to form his own crew and eschew the wilder elements of his previous partners in crime. Joining forces with an experienced safecracker seems to have been a turning point. 

In 1920, operating out of Tulsa, Oklahoma, Willis Newton formed what others eventually called "the Newton Boys," along with Brentwood "Brent Glass" Glasscock, a safecracker and expert in high explosives, convincing his cowboy brothers Joe and later Jess to join his outfit.  Dock's successful 1920 escape from prison in Texas (his fifth) enabled him to join his brothers soon after, and with this quintet as a nucleus, the crew had a good run, robbing banks across Texas, Arkansas, Oklahoma, Kansas, Nebraska, Iowa, Colorado, North Dakota, Missouri, Illinois, Wisconsin, and Canada. Other suspected robberies in Oregon and Washington state have not been confirmed as being their work. 

Most of their heists were committed at night, with them breaking in and busting the bank safe without ever having to come into contact with any people or authorities. Through bribing a corrupt insurance official with the Texas Association of Bankers, Willis obtained a list of banks that still possessed older models of safes that were vulnerable to their brand of attack, which involved forcing nitroglycerin into the cracks in the square door and setting the explosive off with dynamite caps. The resulting explosions were messy and loud but the gang liked to operate in the dead of winter in small farm towns where two men armed with shotguns could keep the few townspeople at bay while the money was hustled out to waiting cars - Studebaker and Cadillac being the preferred makes. Prior to entering the bank, Willis usually shinnied up a pole outside the telephone office and cut the phone lines at a strategic point, thereby ensuring a clean getaway once the county line had been reached. In Hondo, Texas, the gang hit two banks the same night after discovering the first vault door open.

Occasionally the tactics would change, and the crew planned daytime robberies, like in New Braunfels, Texas, a simple bank hold-up on March 9, 1922, or the daring and overly ambitious multiple attack on pedestrian bank messengers in Toronto, Ontario, Canada, on July 24, 1923, when the Toronto Currency Clearinghouse was hit in downtown morning rush hour. A melee ensued when the bank messengers refused to surrender their bags at gunpoint, and the Newtons' reluctance to actually carry out the threats to shoot collided.  Gunfire was exchanged eventually, and two messengers were wounded by Willis in the struggle and subsequent getaway.  Two bags netted the gang some C$84,000 Canadian dollars, but spoiled their reputed non-violent record.  In other robberies the patrons and bank employees often described them as being extremely polite, going out of their way to make sure everyone was comfortable, etc.

The take from most bank jobs was not large, often less than $10,000 in combined cash and negotiable bonds. Liberty Bonds and Victory Bonds often formed the bulk of the take, stolen from individual deposit boxes. Various bonds and other securities were fenced through underworld connections in Chicago, where Willis and Glasscock cultivated contacts. Methodical to the last, Willis insisted on carrying out even the coins from the banks.  "We never get enough. When I go in to get anything, I want a get it all," he liked to brag. Ambitious, Willis invested a great deal of his money into oil wells in Smackover, Arkansas, and Mineral Wells, Texas, hoping to make it big during the boom times for the industry, when millionaires were being made overnight.  Dock and Jess enjoyed the good life, visiting the Kentucky Derby and the Indianapolis 500 several times, and enjoying the night life in Kansas City, Chicago and the like between jobs, eating in the finest restaurants and staying in the nicest hotels, thereby avoiding suspicion. Willis persuaded Joe to invest with him in various oil wells, all of which failed to produce. Born into poverty, the brothers did not save much. Joe joked, "Why didn't you invest that money in something that makes it grow? Why, I said, who wants a better job what we already got? That's what we thought then. I need any money, go out and rob another bank." Interstate crime was difficult to police in those years.  Anonymous and fast moving, the Newton Gang received very little attention from law enforcement, despite the large number of robberies they'd committed. However, that would change when they robbed their sixth train, Milwaukee Road's Fast Mail, a postal train on June 12, 1924.

The gang had teamed up with two Chicago gangsters, two racketeers, and a corrupt postal inspector named William J. Fahy and, using inside information to rob a postal train originating in Chicago, headed north and west and carrying large amounts of currency from the Federal Reserve commissioned for banks along the route. Boarding the train secretly in Chicago, Willis and Jess climbed into the engine and stopped the train at a remote crossing in Rondout, Illinois.  The robbery netted them more than $3 million in one take.  It was the largest train robbery in history.  However, during the robbery, the engineer had overshot the crossing in his nervousness, and had to back the train up, causing some of the robbers to move out of position.  In the confusion, Wylie "Dock" Newton was wounded five times with a .45 caliber pistol fired by Brent Glasscock, who mistook him for an armed postal worker in the dark.  The gang took the money, loaded Dock into a vehicle, and left the scene.  While loading into the vehicle, a bystander supposedly heard one of the robbers say the name "Willie", which was later testified to at trial.  Dock and Joe were arrested first, in a Chicago tenement after police were tipped about an underworld doctor's visit to aid the wounded man.  Willis was arrested when he returned to the room the next day but very nearly bribed his way out, offering $20,000 cash to the arresting officers, who wanted to take it but were double-crossed by a supervisor after the money changed hands.  With Dock, Willis, and Joe Newton captured, Glasscock hid the bulk of the money and Jess Newton evaded capture and headed south to Texas with $35,000. Eventually all those involved with the robbery were arrested, and papers reported that all but $100,000 was recovered.  Facing stiff sentences, the gang members agreed to testify against Fahey and the racketeers, and the prosecution played up the affair as a success for the law, having made an example of the crooked postal inspector and his mob connections.  The exact amount stolen and recovered was impossible to determine, as some insurance claims were not filed, and various deals were cut behind closed doors.  Glasscock very likely kept a low to mid six-figure sum of loose diamonds, untraceable bonds, etc., having eluded the law for the longest period. Having pleaded guilty, and supplied key testimony in convicting others (Glasscock took the witness stand in place of Willis, partially as repayment for his accidental shooting of Dock) the gang received relatively light sentences due to no one being injured but their own gang member, and the majority of the money having been returned. Chicago newspapers portrayed the "Newton Boys" as colorful cowboys due to the fact that Jess was brought to Chicago wearing rodeo clothes, having been tricked across the border into Del Rio, Texas, on a barroom bet involving a bronc ride at an independence day rodeo.  The arresting officer was Texas Ranger Harrison Hamer, a brother of Frank Hamer.

The admitted missing sum of $100,000 was never recovered.  Jess Newton had buried some of it northwest of San Antonio, but being drunk when he did so, he could never remember exactly where.  Jess and Joe, lacking criminal records, received the lightest sentences, and these two brothers returned to Uvalde, Texas, where they led respectable lives, for the most part.  Willis and Dock spent years in Leavenworth, and on release Willis returned to Tulsa where he ran a series of gas stations and nightclubs and seems to have maintained criminal connections.  He rarely spoke about these years in much detail, but he was involved in local "nightclub wars" and was the victim of an assassination attempt at one point, being shot through his bathroom window while shaving.  He survived and prominent episodes of nightclub arson were reported in the same time period.

After the April 6, 1934 murder of Constable Cal Campbell by Clyde Barrow and Henry Methvin in Commerce, Oklahoma, Joe and Willis Newton allowed the Barrow Gang to hide out in a house they owned in Tulsa. The famous fan letter to Henry Ford purportedly from Clyde Barrow was mailed from Tulsa on April 10, 1934; it may have been written at the Newton house. Willis Newton's personal opinion of Bonnie and Clyde was quite low.  He called them "silly kids" who only robbed filling stations and indiscriminately killed people.

In 1934, both Willis and Joe were sentenced to nearly ten-year sentences in Oklahoma for a bank robbery they did not commit, based on specious testimony.  They served at least seven years each. Joe returned to Uvalde, having already renounced crime, in 1924.  Willis returned to Tulsa and the night club life but in the early 1950s also moved back to Uvalde, where he managed to stay out of prison and the limelight for the most part.  Dock Newton was again arrested for bank robbery in 1968, in Rowena, Texas, but due to his old age the charges were dropped.  Willis Newton was implicated in another bank robbery in 1973, in the town of Brackettville, Texas, but there was insufficient evidence to arrest him.

Death of Newtons
Jess Newton died on March 4, 1960, having lived out the remainder of his life as a cowboy in Uvalde.  A veteran of the Texas Brigade of World War One, he died in a VA hospital.  He never was able to remember where the buried money was, and often complained about the country being taken off the gold standard since he apparently lost a great deal of money when stolen bonds were left unredeemed.

Dock was hospitalized after a rough beating during his last arrest, and never fully recovered, although he lived until 1974, dying at the age of 83.

Willis lived in the town of Uvalde, owner of a cafe and other small businesses, an avid horseman into his 80s. Willis lived to age 90, fierce and unrepentant to the end.  He died of old age on August 22, 1979.

Youngest brother Joe Newton died at age 88 on February 3, 1989.

In media
Dock's 1968 arrest for bank robbery at age 77 made national news and was later the subject of an article in LIFE on April 19, 1968.

Authors David Middleton and Claude I. Stanush edited the oral history book The Newton Boys; Portrait of an Outlaw Gang, with the participation of Willis and Joe Newton.  Extensive audio interviews recorded in 1976 formed the basis of the text.  The pair had produced a short documentary film the previous year and wanted to expand on the project.

In November 1980, seventy-nine year old Joe Newton appeared on The Tonight Show and was interviewed by Johnny Carson.

The 1998 film The Newton Boys, starring Matthew McConaughey, Skeet Ulrich, Ethan Hawke, Vincent D'Onofrio, and Dwight Yoakam was based on the gang.

References

External links
The Newton Brothers Gang
The Newton Boys
The Newton Brothers, Bank Robbers
Doc Newton
The Newton Boys, Portrait of an Outlaw Gang

Gangs in Texas
Outlaw gangs in the United States
American bank robbers
Prohibition gangs
Train robbers
People from Uvalde County, Texas